Carmageddon: Reincarnation is a vehicular combat game, the fourth in the Carmageddon series. The game was developed by Stainless Games.

Development
A financial report in 2003 revealed that Carmageddon 4 was in development. The developers were identified as Visual Sciences, who were also working on Carmageddon TV for the Gizmondo handheld console. The publishers were confirmed as Take-Two Interactive's newly formed subsidiary 2K Games (although the same article named the developers as original Carmageddon publishers SCi). Very little information was released about the game until late 2005, when recently merged publishers SCi and Eidos Interactive put development on hold for unspecified reasons. The game was subsequently assumed to have been canned, as no new information or press releases surfaced since that time, and Eidos moved on to focus on other projects.

In 2011, after buying back the rights to the series from then-copyright holders Square Enix Europe, original Carmageddon developers Stainless Games revealed that a new Carmageddon game was in early pre-production stages. After that numerous concept artworks and early in-game test screens were released on the official site.

The new title, Carmageddon: Reincarnation, was funded through Kickstarter in 2012. Stainless Games aimed to raise over $400,000 (£250,000) via Kickstarter in order to produce the game. People who pledged more than $1000 for the project could have the chance to be featured in the game. The $400,000 target was reached in 10 days; if the project raised to $600,000, Mac and Linux versions were also to be produced. This new target was met by the campaign's end in July with a total of $625,143 raised, but the promised Mac and Linux versions were never released. The game was released in May 2015 through the Steam digital service.

Carmageddon: Max Damage
Carmageddon: Max Damage is an updated version of Carmageddon: Reincarnation, which was released on PlayStation 4 and Xbox One in July 2016. The game is available both as digital download and as a physical disc, with the disc version being distributed by Sold Out Sales & Marketing. It was later released for Microsoft Windows on 28 October.

Reception

The PC version of the game received a Metacritic score of 54%.

References

External links
  (archived)
 Carmageddon: Reincarnation at Kickstarter

2015 video games
Fiction about death games
Early access video games
Kickstarter-funded video games
Multiplayer and single-player video games
PlayStation 4 games
Racing video games
Vehicular combat games
Video games developed in the United Kingdom
Windows games
Xbox One games
Stainless Games games